is a railway station on the Hachinohe Line in the city of Kuji, Iwate, Japan, operated by East Japan Railway Company (JR East).

Lines
Kuji Station a terminal station on the Hachinohe Line, and is located 64.9 kilometers from the opposing terminus of the line at Hachinohe Station. It is also a terminal station for the Sanriku Railway Rias Line and is 163.0 kilometers from the opposing terminus at Sakari Station.

Station layout
Kuji Station has a single island platform connected to the station building by a footbridge. The station has a Midori no Madoguchi staffed ticket office. The side of the platform used by the Sanriku Railway is also used by three starting trains per day on the Hachinohe Line.

Platforms

Route bus
JR Bus Tohoku
For Ninohe Station (Tōhoku Shinkansen Relay Bus "Swallow")
For Morioka Station via Rikuchū-Yamagata, Kuzumai and Numakunai (Express Bus "Shirakaba")
Northern Iwate Transportation
For Morioka Station, Morioka Bus Center (Express Bus "Kuji Kohaku")
For Tokyo Dome Hotel, Tokyo Station, Roppongi Hills, Tamachi Station (Express Bus "Iwate Kizuna", with Fuji Express)

History
Kuji Station opened on 27 March 1930. The station became a terminal station for the Kuji Line on 20 July 1976. This line was privatized on 1 April 1984, becoming the Sanriku Railway Kita-Rias Line. Kuji Station was absorbed into the JR East network upon the privatization of the Japanese National Railways (JNR) on 1 April 1987. The 2011 Tōhoku earthquake and tsunami on 11 March 2011 destroyed much of the tracks and many stations on both the Hachinohe Line and the Sanriku Railway. However, the Sanriku Railway resumed operations to Rikuchū-Noda Station by 16 March and to Tanohata Station by 1 April 2012. The Hachinohe Line resumed operations on 17 March 2012. Minami-Rias Line, a segment of Yamada Line, and Kita-Rias Line constitute Rias Line on 23 March 2019. Accordingly, this station became a terminus station of Rias Line.

Passenger statistics
In fiscal 2015, the JR East portion of the station was used by an average of 269 passenger daily (boarding passengers only).

Surrounding area
Kuji Post office

See also
 List of railway stations in Japan

References

External links

 JR East Station information 
 Sanriku Railway Station information 

Railway stations in Iwate Prefecture
Hachinohe Line
Rias Line
Railway stations in Japan opened in 1930
Kuji, Iwate